The 5th women's world championships were held in 1988 for the second time in Chamonix, France. This was the last time that separate world championships were held for women.

Women's results

10 km individual

5 km sprint

3 × 5 km relay

Medal table

References

1988
Biathlon World Championships
International sports competitions hosted by France
Biathlon World Championships}
Biathlon World Championships
Biathlon World Championships
Biathlon competitions in France
Sport in Chamonix